Aadu Puli is a 2011 Indian Tamil language action drama film written and directed by newcomer Vijay Prakash and produced by S. Michael Rayappan. The film stars Aadhi, Poorna, and Prabhu, while Suresh, Ravichandran, K. R. Vijaya, Anupama Kumar, and Yuvarani play supporting roles. The music was composed by Sundar C. Babu with editing by Kishore Te and cinematography by Rajavel Olhiveeran. The film released on 18 February 2011. It opened to negative reviews and was a flop at the box office. The film was dubbed into Telugu as Chelgatam.

Plot
Bhagyanathan (Prabhu) is a crazy fan of  MGR and has named his son Idhayakani (Aadhi). Idhayakani is a nice guy who watches movies, plays basketball, flirts with girls like Anjali (Poorna), and has a happy family consisting of his father, loving mother Kalaiarasi (Anupama), sister, grandfather Sabapathy (Ravichandran), and grandmother Sampoornam (K. R. Vijaya). However, Thillainayagam (Suresh), Anjali's father, is a cunning minister and ruthless politician who wants to be the next CM by hook or crook. He does not approve of Idhayakanni as his future son-in-law and has an army of goondas like Paal Pandi ready to take on his enemies. How our larger than life hero wages a one-man battle against the evil minister and his henchmen forms the rest of the story.

Cast

 Aadhi as Idhayakani Bhagyanathan
 Prabhu as Bhagyanathan
 Poorna as Anjali Thillainayagam
 Suresh as Thillainayagam
 Ravichandran as Sabapathy
 K. R. Vijaya as Sampoornam
 Anupama Kumar as Kalaiarasi Bhagyanathan
 Yuvarani as Mrs. Thillainayagam
 Srinath as Idhayakanni's friend
 Soori
 Nizhalgal Ravi
 Mayilsamy as Thillainayagam's assistant

Soundtrack
Soundtrack was composed by Sundar C. Babu, with lyrics written by Vaali, Viveka, Yugabharathi, V. Prakash, and Kalaikumar.

"Oorellam" - Shankar Mahadevan
"Satham Illai" - SPB
"Annakkili" - Karthik, Chinmayi
"Koppayil" - Naveen
"Thodugiral" - Suchithra, Jyotsna
"Unnai Ninaithadume" - Hariharan, Sujatha Mohan

Reception
Behindwoods wrote "On the whole, this film that is salvaged by Suresh and Aadhi’s performance, might work for extremely patient people who like clichéd masala flicks." Rediff wrote "Aadu Puli is just another masala flick that's simply not spicy enough." Sify wrote "Aadu Puli is strictly for those who love their daily dose of mass masala movie masquerading as a family entertainer".

References

External links
 

Indian action drama films
2011 action drama films
2011 masala films
2011 films
2010s Tamil-language films
Films scored by Sundar C. Babu